K R Gangadharan (1936–2012) who popularly referred to as KRG, was a Tamil film producer. He produced over 60 films in Tamil and Malayalam under the banner ‘KRG Productions’, 'KRG Art Productions', 'KRG Enterprises' and 'KRG Movies International'.

Film career
He founded the Tamil Film Producer's Council and had a stint as president of the South Indian Film Chamber of Commerce. He was elected as the president of the South India Film Chamber, unanimously by the producers of Tamil, Telugu, Malayalam and Kannada film's, distributors, studio owners, theatre owners are members of the association.

Partial filmography

Death
KRG died on 19 June 2012, aged 76. He was admitted to a private hospital at T. Nagar in Chennai, and had been responding well to treatment. He was about to be discharged on the day he died, but as he was about to step out, he collapsed and was declared dead soon after, the sources said. He is survived by his wife and daughter.

References

External links
 

1936 births
2012 deaths
Tamil film producers
Film producers from Chennai
Malayalam film producers